John William Waterhouse  (6 April 184910 February 1917) was an English painter known for working first in the Academic style and for then embracing the Pre-Raphaelite Brotherhood's style and subject matter. His artworks were known for their depictions of women from both ancient Greek mythology and Arthurian legend.

Born in Rome to English parents who were both painters, Waterhouse later moved to London, where he enrolled in the Royal Academy of Art. He soon began exhibiting at their annual summer exhibitions, focusing on the creation of large canvas works depicting scenes from the daily life and mythology of ancient Greece. Many of his paintings are based on authors such as Homer, Ovid, Shakespeare, Tennyson, or Keats.

Waterhouse's work is displayed in many major art museums and galleries, and the Royal Academy of Art organised a major retrospective of his work in 2009.

Biography

Early life
Waterhouse was born in the city of Rome to English painters William and Isabella Waterhouse in 1849, in the same year that the members of the Pre-Raphaelite Brotherhood, including Dante Gabriel Rossetti, John Everett Millais and William Holman Hunt, were first causing a stir in the London art scene. The exact date of his birth is unknown, though he was baptised on 6 April, and the later scholar of Waterhouse's work, Peter Trippi, believed that he was born between 1 and 23 January. His early life in Italy has been cited as one of the reasons many of his later paintings were set in ancient Rome or based upon scenes taken from Roman mythology.

In 1854, the Waterhouses returned to England and moved to a newly built house in South Kensington, London, which was near to the newly founded Victoria and Albert Museum. Waterhouse, or 'Nino' as he was nicknamed, coming from an artistic family, was encouraged to become involved in drawing, and often sketched artworks that he found in the British Museum and the National Gallery. In 1871 he entered the Royal Academy of Art school, initially to study sculpture, before moving on to painting.

Early career

Waterhouse's early works were not Pre-Raphaelite in nature, but were of classical themes in the spirit of Alma-Tadema and Frederic Leighton. These early works were exhibited at the Dudley Gallery, and the Society of British Artists, and in 1874 his painting Sleep and his Half-brother Death was exhibited at the Royal Academy summer exhibition. The painting was a success and Waterhouse would exhibit at the annual exhibition every year until 1916, with the exception of 1890 and 1915. He then went from strength to strength in the London art scene, his 1876 piece After the Dance being given the prime position in that year's summer exhibition. Perhaps due to his success, his paintings typically became larger and larger in size.

Later career

In 1883, Waterhouse married Esther Kenworthy, the daughter of an art schoolmaster from Ealing who had exhibited her own flower-paintings at the Royal Academy and elsewhere.  In 1895 Waterhouse was elected to the status of full Academician. He taught at the St. John's Wood Art School, joined the St John's Wood Arts Club, and served on the Royal Academy Council.

One of Waterhouse's best known subjects is The Lady of Shalott, a study of Elaine of Astolat as depicted in the 1832 poem by Alfred, Lord Tennyson, who dies of a mysterious curse after looking directly at the beautiful Lancelot. He actually painted three different versions of this character, in 1888, 1894, and 1916. Another of Waterhouse's favorite subjects was Ophelia; the most familiar of his paintings of Ophelia depicts her just before her death, putting flowers in her hair as she sits on a tree branch leaning over a lake. Like The Lady of Shalott and other Waterhouse paintings, it deals with a woman dying in or near water. He may also have been inspired by paintings of Ophelia by Dante Gabriel Rossetti and John Everett Millais. He submitted his 1888 Ophelia painting in order to receive his diploma from the Royal Academy. (He had originally wanted to submit a painting titled A Mermaid, but it was not completed in time.) After this, the painting was lost until the 20th century.  It is now displayed in the collection of Lord Lloyd-Webber. Waterhouse would paint Ophelia again in 1894 and 1909 or 1910, and he planned another painting in the series, called Ophelia in the Churchyard.

Waterhouse could not finish the series of Ophelia paintings because he was gravely ill with cancer by 1915. He died two years later, and his grave can be found at Kensal Green Cemetery in London.

Gallery
In total, he produced 118 paintings. See List of paintings by John William Waterhouse for an almost complete list.

1870s

1880s

1890s

1900s

1910s

References

Notes

Bibliography

Further reading

 
 
 
 
 
 .
 .

External links

 John William Waterhouse.net
 John William Waterhouse (The Art and Life of JW Waterhouse);
 John William Waterhouse (Comprehensive Painting Gallery)
 John William Waterhouse (1849–1917)
 John William Waterhouse Style and Technique
 Waterhouse at Tate Britain
 Echo and Narcissus (1903)
 Ten Dreams Galleries
 John William Waterhouse in the "History of Art"
 Profile on Royal Academy of Arts Collections
 
 
 
 
 
 Findagrave burial record

1849 births
1917 deaths
19th-century English painters
20th-century English painters
Italian emigrants to the United Kingdom
Artists' Rifles soldiers
Burials at Kensal Green Cemetery
English male painters
Neo-Pompeian painters
Orientalist painters
01
Artists from London
People of the Victorian era
Pre-Raphaelite painters
Royal Academicians
Members of the Royal Institute of Painters in Water Colours
20th-century English male artists
19th-century English male artists